Canning Terrace was erected in 1837-1840 on Zion Hill at Canning Circus,  Nottingham.

History
It was built as a series of almshouses flanking the cemetery gatehouse, by the architect Samuel Sutton Rawlinson. It was named after George Canning, Prime Minister in 1827.

References

Almshouses in Nottingham
Grade II listed buildings in Nottinghamshire
Buildings and structures in Nottingham
Residential buildings completed in 1840
Grade II listed almshouses